General elections were held in the Democratic Republic of the Congo between 18 March and 30 April 1965, following the promulgation of a new constitution approved by a referendum the previous year. 223 political parties contested the election for 167 seats in the Chamber of Deputies.

The elections were won by parties allied with the Congolese National Convention, led by former secessionist leader Moise Tshombe, which won a total of 80 seats. Following the elections, the results were disputed by several parties. The Léopoldville Court of Appeal accepted six of them, and re-runs were required in Kivu Central, Goma-Rutshuru, Cuvette Centrale, Fizi, Kwilu and Maniema, which were held between 8 and 22 August 1965.

Despite Tshombe's party winning the election, President Joseph Kasa-Vubu appointed Évariste Kimba of the Congolese Democratic Front Prime Minister, a situation which ultimately led to Joseph Mobutu carrying out a military coup in November. By the next election in 1970, Mobutu had eliminated all opposition parties, allowing his Popular Movement of the Revolution to run unopposed. As a result, the 1965 election would be the last in which opposition parties were allowed to participate until 2006.

Results

References

DR Congo
Elections in the Democratic Republic of the Congo
1965 in the Democratic Republic of the Congo
Election and referendum articles with incomplete results